Grace Darling  (1815–1842) was an English lighthouse keeper's daughter.

Grace Darling may also refer to:

 Grace Darling: Maid and Myth, a 1965 biography by Richard Armstrong
 "Grace Darling" (song), a 1974 song by Strawbs
 MV Grace Darling (1919), a ferry that operated on Okanagan Lake in British Columbia 
 MV Grace Darling (1923), a replacement for the 1919 ferry
 Grace Darling (actress) (1893–1963), American actress